Parent station is a staffed Via Rail station in La Tuque, Quebec, Canada. It is located on rue Commerciale in the Parent community.

External links

Via Rail stations in Quebec
Railway stations in Mauricie
La Tuque, Quebec